Cherkin may refer to:
Georgii Cherkin (born 1977), Bulgarian pianist
Cherkin, Iran, a village in Chaharmahal and Bakhtiari Province, Iran